Kim Sung-Min (born 29 June 1987) is a South Korean judoka. He graduated from Yong In University. At the 2008 Asian Judo Championships, his first international adult competition, he won a gold medal. He went on to win a bronze medal in the 2011 World Judo Championships.

At the 2012 Summer Olympics, he reached the semi-finals where he lost to eventual champion Teddy Riner.  He then lost his bronze medal match to Rafael Silva.

At the 2016 Summer Olympics, he was knocked out in the second round to Roy Meyer.

References

External links
 

1987 births
Living people
Sportspeople from Gyeonggi Province
South Korean male judoka
Judoka at the 2012 Summer Olympics
Judoka at the 2016 Summer Olympics
Olympic judoka of South Korea
Judoka at the 2014 Asian Games
Judoka at the 2018 Asian Games
Asian Games gold medalists for South Korea
Asian Games bronze medalists for South Korea
Asian Games medalists in judo
Medalists at the 2014 Asian Games
Medalists at the 2018 Asian Games
Universiade medalists in judo
Yong In University alumni
Universiade gold medalists for South Korea
Medalists at the 2011 Summer Universiade
Medalists at the 2013 Summer Universiade
20th-century South Korean people
21st-century South Korean people